Târsa may refer to several villages in Romania:

 Târsa, a village in Avram Iancu Commune, Alba County
 Târsa, a village in Boșorod Commune, Hunedoara County
 Târsa, a village in Stângăceaua Commune, Mehedinți County